Kundabung is a locality on the North Coast of New South Wales, Australia.

Transport
The North Coast railway line passes through, and a station existed at the site between 1917 and 1974. At the 2006 census, Kundabung had a population of 586 people. The town's name is derived from an aboriginal word meaning "wild apples". The Pacific Highway also crosses the locality.

References 

Mid North Coast
Towns in New South Wales
North Coast railway line, New South Wales